Quasimodo is a student newspaper published by the Fremantle Student Association at the University of Notre Dame Australia in Fremantle. The magazine takes its name from Quasimodo, Victor Hugo's fictional bell-ringer and protagonist of  Notre Dame de Paris

Politics
In 2005, former Quasi editor Chris Bailey charged that the university's Catholic hierarchy sought to restrict the range of topics discussed in the magazine, telling The Australian that he and other contributors were "unofficially told by university staff that students involved in defying the university may be kicked out of uni." Upcoming editions are vetted by a review committee of university and student representatives – "Quasimodo now is very much G-rated" as a result, Bailey claimed.

One Quasi edition, containing an article on the morning-after pill, was banned by vice-chancellor Peter Tannock.

References

  Christopher van Opstal: The art of censorship

1990 establishments in Australia
Magazines established in 1990
Student newspapers published in Australia
Conservative magazines
Conservatism in Australia
Magazines published in Sydney
Student magazines

University of Notre Dame Australia